Abdar (also Romanized as Ābdar) is a village in Avarzaman Rural District, Samen District, Malayer County, Hamadan Province, Iran. At the 2006 census, its population was 815, in 202 families.

References 

Populated places in Malayer County